John Donnelly Fage  (3 June 1921–6 August 2002) was a British historian who was among the earliest academic historians specialising in African history, especially of the pre-colonial period, in the United Kingdom and West Africa. He published a number of influential studies on West African history including Introduction to the History of West Africa (1955). He subsequently co-founded the Journal of African History, the first specialist academic journal in the field, with Roland Oliver in 1960.

Career

Early life
John Fage was born in Teddington in Middlesex, England on 3 June 1921. He was educated at Tonbridge School and Magdalene College, Cambridge from 1939 where he studied history but his studies were interrupted by World War II. Fage was conscripted into the Royal Air Force (RAF) in 1942 and was posted to Southern Rhodesia (modern-day Zimbabwe) as part of the Commonwealth Air Training Plan and was subsequently given several postings in Africa, including in Madagascar. The experience sparked an interest in African history and he began research in the field on his return to Cambridge in 1945 where he lectured on European colonial expansion on the continent. He gained a doctorate at Cambridge in 1949 entitled "The achievement of self-government in Southern Rhodesia, 1898–1923". T.C. McCaskie noted that Fage "was part of a generation that emerged from the second world war into the optimistic ferment that surrounded both African decolonisation and British university expansion".

Ghana and SOAS

In 1949, Fage took a post at the new University College of the Gold Coast in Accra, Gold Coast (modern-day Ghana) in West Africa which was affiliated to the University of London. Rising through the academic hierarchy, he published Introduction to the History of West Africa (1955, later re-published as A History of West Africa) and Atlas of African History (1958) and A Short History of Africa (1962). After Ghana's independence, Fage became Deputy Principal of the then-University College of Ghana and helped to establish the Institute of African Studies at Legon. It was said:

In 1959, Fage returned to the United Kingdom to take a post at the School of Oriental and African Studies (SOAS) in London alongside Roland Oliver with whom he collaborated on several publications. With Oliver, Fage founded the Journal of African History (JAH) in 1960 which he co-edited until 1973. The JAH was the first academic journal devoted to African studies in the United Kingdom and one of the first such specialist journals globally.

Birmingham and CWAS
Fage moved to the University of Birmingham in 1963 to establish the Centre of West African Studies (CWAS) which he directed for over twenty years. African studies expanded rapidly in the United Kingdom at the same time, and Fage became one of the founding members of the African Studies Association of the United Kingdom (ASAUK) in which he served as president (1968–69) before being elected an honorary member. Fage and Oliver were also general editors of The Cambridge History of Africa (1975–86) and Fage also co-edited the General History of Africa (1981–93) published by UNESCO. Fage also published A History of Africa (1978) for The History of Human Society series.

Fage chaired the United Kingdom National Commission for UNESCO (1966–83) and was a committee member of the International African Institute and a Fellow of the Royal Historical Society. His academic career culminated in his appointment as Vice-Principal of the University of Birmingham. Fage retired in 1984 and moved to Wales.  He was a joint recipient of ASAUK's "Distinguished Africanist Award" in 2001. He died, aged 81, at Machynlleth on 6 August 2002.

See also
Basil Davidson - an early popular historian who wrote on African history in the same period
Albert Adu Boahen - an early Ghanaian historian who collaborated with Fage on several projects

References

Bibliography

External links
John Fage: Historian of west Africa who established a new academic field at The Guardian

1921 births
2002 deaths
English Africanists
Alumni of Magdalene College, Cambridge
Historians of Africa
Academics of the University of Birmingham
20th-century British historians
People from Teddington
Academic staff of the University of Ghana
Academics of SOAS University of London
Historians of Zimbabwe
People educated at Tonbridge School
Royal Air Force personnel of World War II
Military personnel from Middlesex
British expatriates in Ghana
British expatriates in Southern Rhodesia
British expatriates in Madagascar